Joseph-Mathias Gérard de Rayneval (24 February 1736, Masevaux, Haut-Rhin – 31 December 1812, Paris), was a French  diplomat and government minister of the Ancien Régime.

Career
Gérard de Rayneval served under the Bourbon Foreign Minister, Charles Gravier de Vergennes, as Under-Secretary of State for Foreign Affairs and Trade.
In 1776, he produced a memo on France's strategic and diplomatic interests entitled Reflections on the Situation in America.

In 1782, he was sent on a secret mission to London to make peace feelers, before later undertaking official diplomatic visits (qv. Eden Agreement).

John Jay, a Founding Father of the United States, upon learning of the trips suspected French duplicity, leading him to begin separate negotiations with the British. He wrote about his negotiations with Jay over the Mississippi:  

If by the future treaty of peace, Spain preserves West Florida, she alone will be the sole proprietor of the course of the Mississippi from the thirty-first degree of latitude to the mouth of this river. Whatever may be the case with that part which is beyond this point to the north, the United States of America can have no pretentions to it, not being masters of either border to this river.

On 30 November, preliminary articles of peace were signed but it took a year, until 3 September 1783, for the Paris Peace Treaty to be signed.

Chevalier Gérard de Rayneval was appointed to the Royal Order of Charles III and served in King Louis XVI's Conseil d'Etat.

Family
He was the fourth son of Claude Gérard, of Masmünster in Alsace, by his wife Marie-Françoise Wetzel.

In Paris on 8 August 1776, he married Sophie Gaucherel and had by her three children:

 Adélaïde Gérard de Rayneval (1777-1860);
 Maximilien Gérard de Rayneval (1778-1836), created a Baron;
 Alexandrine-Sophie Gérard de Rayneval (1780-1823).

His eldest brother was Conrad-Alexandre Gérard, comte de Munster.

See also 
 List of Ambassadors of France to Great Britain
 Mailly-Raineval
 Melville Henry Massue

References

External links

External links
www.diplomatie.gouv.fr

1736 births
1812 deaths
People from Alsace
18th-century French diplomats
French politicians
French people of the American Revolution
Ambassadors of France to Great Britain
Diplomacy during the American Revolutionary War